"The Voice" is the second single released from the Moody Blues' 1981 album Long Distance Voyager. The song continued the success of previous single "Gemini Dream", becoming a Top 40 hit on the Billboard Hot 100, where it peaked at No. 15 in October 1981. The song had previously topped the Billboard Top Rock Tracks chart for four weeks during June–July 1981. The song also reached No. 9 in Canada.

According to Allmusic critic Dave Connolly, the song "is a sweeping and majestic call to adventure."  Billboard described it as "a texturally lush piece of pop in the best tradition of [the Moody Blues'] earlier work". Record World said that "The symphonic arrangement envelops Justin Hayward's dramatic vocal."

Classic Rock critic Malcolm Dome rated it as the Moody Blues' 5th greatest song, saying that the song "offers hope for the future, as long as people take control of their lives and events."  Ultimate Classic Rock critic Nick DeRiso rated it as the Moody Blues' 6th greatest song, saying that it is "one of the last [Moody Blues songs] to so deftly marry the mystical elements of Hayward's classic songcraft with [a more] modern approach."

Personnel
 Justin Hayward: electric and acoustic guitars, lead vocals
 John Lodge: bass guitar, backing vocals
 Ray Thomas: tambourine, backing vocals
 Patrick Moraz: piano, mellotron, Oberheim Custom double 8-voice synthesizer, Yamaha CS80, Roland Jupiter 8, Minimoog
 Graeme Edge: drums

Chart performance

Weekly charts

Year-end charts

See also
List of Billboard Mainstream Rock number-one songs of the 1980s

References

1981 singles
1981 songs
The Moody Blues songs
Songs written by Justin Hayward
Song recordings produced by Pip Williams